Zircon Airways Benin was an airline based in Benin. It was founded in 2001 and ceased operations in 2002.

Code data
IATA Code: Z4
ICAO Code: BZW (not current)
Callsign: ZIRCON (not current)

See also		
 List of defunct airlines of Benin

References

External links
Zircon Airways Benin (archive link, was dead)

Defunct airlines of Benin
Airlines established in 2001
Airlines disestablished in 2002